Marïa Dolores Agüero Lara (born 1982) is a Honduran politician who served as acting Foreign Minister from 14 April 2016 and was officially appointed as Minister of Foreign Affairs on 27 March 2017 and served until 23 July 2019.

Early life and education
Agüero's father is the vice president of Banco Atlántida. She has a brother and a sister. Agüero has degrees in Legal Sciences and International Law from the Universidad Nacional Autónoma de Honduras and a master's degree in International Law from the University of Chile and Heidelberg University.

Career
Agüero was a legal advisor to the Honduran Private Business Council and an associate at Lópes Rodezno law firm. She began working at the Ministry of Foreign Affairs and International Cooperation in 2010, and in 2013 joined the Diplomatic and Consular Service of Honduras.

Agüero was appointed Vice Minister of Foreign Affairs in December 2015 and became acting Foreign Minister under President Juan Orlando Hernandez in April 2016 after the resignation of Arturo Corrales. She was officially appointed as Minister on 27 March 2017. In July 2019 she was succeeded by Lisandro Rosales.

Personal life
She is the niece of former Foreign Affairs minister Mireya Agüero.

References

External links
 Government CV

 1982 births
 Living people
Foreign Ministers of Honduras
Female foreign ministers
Women government ministers of Honduras
Universidad Nacional Autónoma de Honduras alumni
University of Chile alumni
Heidelberg University alumni
21st-century Honduran women politicians
21st-century Honduran politicians
Honduran women diplomats
Honduran expatriates in Germany
Honduran expatriates in Chile